Christ Church is an Episcopal church in the Old City neighborhood of Philadelphia. Founded in 1695 as a parish of the Church of England, it played an integral role in the founding of the Protestant Episcopal Church in the United States. In 1785, its rector, William White, became the first Presiding Bishop of the Episcopal Church.

From 1754 to 1810, the church's  tower and steeple was the tallest structure in the Thirteen Colonies and, later, the tallest structure in the United States.

History

Christ Church was founded in 1695 by members of the Church of England, who built a small wooden church on the site by the next year. In 1700, Evan Evans travelled from Wales to become their rector.

When the congregation outgrew the original building twenty years after its construction, they decided to erect a new church, the most sumptuous in the colonies. Christ Church is considered one of the nation's most beautiful surviving 18th-century structures, a monument to colonial craftsmanship and a handsome example of Georgian architecture. Modeled on the work in London of Christopher Wren, it features a symmetrical, classical façade with arched windows and a simple yet elegant interior with fluted columns and wooden pews. Although the architect of the church is unknown, its construction was supervised by John Kearsley, a physician, who was likely also responsible for the design, possibly with John Harrison. The church was rebuilt in 1777 by Robert Smith, and the interior was altered in 1883 by Thomas Ustick Walter.

The baptismal font in which William Penn was baptized is still in use at Christ Church; it was sent to Philadelphia in 1697 from All Hallows-by-the-Tower in London. Another baptismal font and the communion table were crafted by Philadelphia cabinetmaker Jonathan Gostelowe, who served on the vestry in the 1790s.

Christ Church's congregation included 15 signers of the Declaration of Independence.  American Revolutionary War leaders who attended Christ Church include George Washington, Robert Morris, Benjamin Franklin and Betsy Ross (after she had been read out of the Quaker meeting house to which she belonged for marrying John Ross, son of an assistant rector at Christ Church).  Brass plaques mark the pews where these individuals once sat. At the convening of the First Continental Congress in September 1774, Rector Jacob Duché was summoned to Carpenters' Hall to lead the opening prayers. During the war, the Reverend William White (1748–1836), rector of Christ Church, served as Chaplain to both the Continental Congress and the United States Senate.

In September 1785, clerical and lay deputies from several states met in Christ Church and organized as a general convention, of which White was chosen president. He prepared a draft constitution for the church as well as an address to the archbishops and bishops of the Church of England, asking for the episcopate at their hands. White was also largely responsible for the liturgy and offices of the first American Book of Common Prayer (published 1789), which were to be submitted to Church of England authorities.  At the convention of the Diocese of Pennsylvania in 1786, he was elected its first bishop and sailed for England with Dr. Samuel Provoost of New York, seeking consecration. After passage of a special enabling act by Parliament, White and Provoost were consecrated in early 1787 by the archbishops of Canterbury and York. Bishop White returned to Philadelphia that Easter Sunday. In 1789, under White's direction, the first meeting of the House of Bishops was held at Christ Church, marking the first true General Convention of the Episcopal Church in the United States of America.  White was the first Episcopal Bishop of Pennsylvania and served the congregations of Christ Church and St. Peter's Church for decades.  White is buried in the church's chancel.

Christ Church is a National Historic Landmark and a unique historic site that continues its original function as an Episcopal parish.  More than 250,000 tourists visit the church each year.

Notable interments
Several notable people are buried in the church and adjacent churchyard, including:
 Jacob Broom (1752–1810), signer of the United States Constitution from Delaware
 Pierce Butler (1744-1822), signer of the United States Constitution from South Carolina
 Elizabeth Graeme Fergusson (1739–1801), poet, early American writer
 John Forbes (1710–1759), British commander during the French and Indian War, who captured Fort Duquesne, was an advocate for Native Americans and named the city of Pittsburgh.
 Andrew Hamilton (1676–1741), lawyer known as "The Philadelphia Lawyer"
 Charles Lee (1731–1782), Revolutionary War Continental Major General
 Robert Morris (1734–1806), signer of the United States Declaration of Independence, the Articles of Confederation, and the United States Constitution
 John Penn (1729–1795), governor and proprietor of provincial Pennsylvania
 James Wilson (1742–1798), signer of the United States Declaration of Independence and the United States Constitution; Associate Justice of the Supreme Court of the United States
 William White (1748–1836), rector of Saint Peter Church and Christ Church, first Episcopal Bishop of Pennsylvania, and first and fourth Presiding Bishop of The Episcopal Church

Many other notable people are buried at nearby associated Christ Church Burial Ground including Benjamin Franklin and four other signers of the Declaration of Independence.

Other notable events
John Inglis was baptised here in September 1744.

See also
 
 
 List of National Historic Landmarks in Philadelphia
 National Register of Historic Places listings in Center City, Philadelphia

References

External links

 Christ Church parish web site
 Christ Church at the Historic American Buildings Survey
 Christ Church at Philadelphia Architects and Buildings
 Christ Episcopal Churchyard at Find a Grave
 Digitized historical documents from Christ Church

Cemeteries in Philadelphia
Churches in Philadelphia
Properties of religious function on the National Register of Historic Places in Philadelphia
1695 establishments in Pennsylvania
Religious organizations established in 1695
Episcopal churches in Pennsylvania
National Historic Landmarks in Pennsylvania
18th-century Episcopal church buildings
Georgian architecture in Pennsylvania
Old City, Philadelphia
Churches completed in 1744
Churches on the National Register of Historic Places in Pennsylvania